Legendary Hearts is the twelfth solo studio album by American rock musician Lou Reed, released in March 1983 by RCA Records. Reed self-produced the album, and dedicated it to his then-wife, Sylvia, who was credited with the cover concept. Due to tensions with Reed, most of Robert Quine's guitar parts were mixed down or removed entirely.

Legendary Hearts peaked at No. 159 on the U.S. Billboard 200 chart. Two singles were released from the album: "Don't Talk to Me About Work" and "Martial Law", both of which failed to chart. Two music videos were produced for the album: "Legendary Hearts" and "Don't Talk to Me About Work".

Recording
Robert Quine later said of his work with Reed, "The atmosphere was really uptight – it's impossible to be friends with him. When I got the final mix, I was really freaked out. He pretty much mixed me off the record. I was in Ohio and took it out in the driveway and smashed the tape into pieces... I have cassettes of the rough mix of the record and it was a really good record but he made it all muddy and murky."

Critical reception

Upon release, Legendary Hearts received favorable reviews from music critics. Writing for The Village Voice, music journalist Robert Christgau said that "if The Blue Mask was a tonic, the follow-up's a long drink of water, trading impact and intensity for the stated goal of this (final?) phase of Reed's music: continuity, making do, the long haul." NME critic Cynthia Rose wrote that Legendary Hearts was "possibly the purest, most fluid and spiritual musical unity you'll hear in rock and roll for some time to come – with Reed's cleansed, declamatory vocals well up front".

Robert Palmer of The New York Times praised Legendary Hearts as "a song cycle without any outstanding weak links... All the songs are personal, from the domestic still-life portrait 'Rooftop Garden' to 'Bottoming Out' and 'The Last Shot,' powerful confrontations between Lou Reed the loving husband and Lou Reed the self-destructive monster. The only villain on Legendary Hearts is Lou Reed, but because he has confronted his own defects as bravely as he once confronted the decadence around him, he is also the album's hero. The two Lou Reeds have finally become one." Palmer also praised the musicianship, writing that "the band's playing and arrangements make these fine songs even better... The album's more reflective moments are made deeper and richer by ensemble playing that manages to be gentle without ever losing its tensile strength."

Ira Robbins of Trouser Press wrote that the album "ranks with any Reed record all the way back to the Velvets in substance and stands out as his strongest work in style, using the group as a powerful lens that magnifies his themes and obsessions down to the finest detail."

Legendary Hearts would later place seventh in The Village Voices annual Pazz & Jop critics' poll.

In a retrospective review for AllMusic, critic Mark Deming wrote of the album, "On Legendary Hearts, Reed was writing great songs, playing them with enthusiasm and imagination, and singing them with all his heart and soul, and if it wasn't his best album, it was more than good enough to confirm that the brilliance of The Blue Mask was no fluke, and that Reed had reestablished himself as one of the most important artists in American rock."

Track listing

Personnel
Credits are adapted from the Legendary Hearts liner notes.

Musicians
 Lou Reed – vocals, guitar
 Robert Quine – guitar
 Fred Maher – drums
 Fernando Saunders – bass guitar

Production and artwork
 Lou Reed – producer
 Corky Stasiak – engineer
 Jim Crotty – associate engineer
 Greg Calbi – mastering
 Waring Abbott – photography; art direction
 Sylvia Reed – cover concept

Chart performance

See also
 List of albums released in 1983
 Lou Reed discography

References

External links
 

1983 albums
Lou Reed albums
RCA Records albums
Albums produced by Lou Reed